Sissignore, internationally released as Dismissed on His Wedding Night and Yes Sir, is a 1968 Italian comedy film written, directed and starred by Ugo Tognazzi.

Plot 
Oscar (Ugo Tognazzi) is a driver whom to stay in the good graces of his master, a well-known businessman known as the "Lawyer" (Gastone Moschin), assumes the responsibility of a serious car accident, with 15 deaths, caused by the "Lawyer".

After three years in prison, Oscar comes out but is promptly brought to the church to marry a beautiful young woman (Maria Grazia Buccella) whom he has never seen before and that is actually the lover of the "Lawyer".

Cast 
Ugo Tognazzi as Oscar Pettini
Maria Grazia Buccella as  Maria Tommaso
Gastone Moschin as  the "Lawyer"
Franco Fabrizi as  Ottavio, the butler
Ferruccio De Ceresa as  Calandra 
Franco Giacobini as  Facchetti

References

External links

Sissignore at Variety Distribution

1968 films
1960s Italian-language films
1968 comedy films
Films directed by Ugo Tognazzi
Adultery in films
Italian comedy films
Films scored by Berto Pisano
1960s Italian films